Gaoliying Town is a town just north of the Northern 6th Ring Road, in Shunyi District, Beijing.

The town is situated at the intersection of the Jingcheng Expressway, a six-lane expressway linking central Beijing via Huairou District and Miyun District to Chengde in Hebei province, and the 6th Ring Road. In the year 2020, its population was 80,840.

The name Gaoliying refers to the large amount of immigrants from Goryeo that settled in this region during the Tang dynasty.

History

Administrative divisions 
As of 2021, Gaoliying Town consisted of 26 subdivisions, including 1 community and 25 villages:

Gallery

See also 

 List of township-level divisions of Beijing

References 

Towns in Beijing
Shunyi District